Thomas James Seaborn (March 6, 1890 – January 15, 1964) was a Canadian professional ice hockey player who played in the Pacific Coast Hockey Association for the Vancouver Millionaires.

Playing career
Seaborn was a defenceman who played for the Vancouver Millionaires during the 1914–15 and 1915–16 seasons. Seaborn fought in World War I with the Canadian Army before returning to hockey in 1919 with the Everett Reds. He moved to Duluth to play with the Duluth Hornets and had a minor league career in the American Hockey Association (AHA) for Duluth, St. Louis, Chicago, Minnesota, and Kansas City, where he retired in 1932.

Seaborn died at age 71, in 1964 in Kansas City, Missouri.

References

External links

Stanley Cup Search Nets Audrey A Long-Lost Cousin

1890 births
1964 deaths
Canadian ice hockey defencemen
Vancouver Millionaires players
Ice hockey people from Winnipeg